Badminton Association of India (BAI) is the governing body of badminton in India. BAI is an association registered under the societies act. It was formed in 1934, and has been holding national-level tournaments in India since 1936.

BAI has 28 state members that conduct badminton tournaments and have a two-times voting power compared to the affiliate members, who do not conduct tournaments and have a single vote each in the association. It is headquartered in New Delhi, India.

Tournaments
 India Open, an annual tournament which is currently part of BWF World Tour
 Syed Modi International Badminton Championships, a tournament created in memory of the Commonwealth Games gold medalist Syed Modi.
 Hyderabad Open
 Odisha Open
 Premier Badminton League
 Indian National Badminton Championships

Affiliated associations
As of 2018, BAI has a total of 33 affiliated associations.

 Andhra Pradesh Badminton Association
 Andaman & Nicobar Island Badminton Association
 Arunachal State Badminton Association
 Assam Badminton Association
 Bihar Badminton Association
 Chandigarh Badminton Association
 Chhattisgarh Badminton Association
 Delhi Capital Badminton Association
 Goa Badminton Association
 Gujarat Badminton Association
 Haryana Badminton Association
 Himachal Pradesh Badminton Association
 Jammu and Kashmir Badminton Association
 Jharkhand Badminton Association
 Karnataka Badminton Association
 Kerala Badminton Association
 Maharashtra Badminton Association
 Madhya Pradesh Badminton Association
 Manipur Badminton Association
 Meghalaya Badminton Association
 Mizoram Badminton Association
 Nagaland Badminton Association
 Orissa State Badminton Association
 Pondicherry Badminton Association
 Punjab Badminton Association
 Rajasthan Badminton Association
 Badminton Association Of Sikkim
 Tamil Nadu Badminton Association
 Telangana Badminton Association
 Tripura Badminton Association
 Uttar Pradesh Badminton Association
 Uttarakhand Badminton Association
 West Bengal Badminton Association

See also
 Badminton in India
 India national badminton team
 Indian National Badminton Championships

References

External links
 BAI Website

India
Sports governing bodies in India
Badminton in India
Organisations based in Lucknow
Sports organizations established in 1934
Badminton organizations
1934 establishments in India